The cowboy hat is a high-crowned, wide-brimmed hat best known as the defining piece of attire for the North American cowboy. Today it is worn by many people, and is particularly associated with ranch workers in the western and southern United States, western Canada and northern Mexico, with many country, regional Mexican and sertanejo music performers, and with participants in the North American rodeo circuit. It is recognized around the world as part of Old West apparel.

The cowboy hat as known today has many antecedents to its design, including Mexican hats such as the sombrero, the various designs of wide-brimmed hat worn by farmers and stockmen in the eastern United States, as well as the designs used by the United States Cavalry.

The first western model was the open-crowned "Boss of the Plains", and after that came the front-creased Carlsbad, destined to become "the" cowboy style. The high-crowned, wide-brimmed, soft-felt western hats that followed are intimately associated with the cowboy image.

History

The concept of a broad-brimmed hat with a high crown worn by a rider on horseback can be seen as far back as the Mongolian horsemen of the 13th century.  The hat has a tall crown that provides insulation, and a wide brim that provides shade. Hot and sunny climates inspire designs with very wide brims such as the sombrero of Mexico.

It is not clear when the cowboy hat received its name. However, European-Americans in the Western United States originally had no standard headwear. People moving West wore many styles of hat, including top hats, bowlers, Civil War headgear such as cavalry and slouch hats, and sailor hats.
Contrary to popular belief, it was the bowler and not the cowboy hat that was the most popular in the American West, prompting Lucius Beebe to call it "the hat that won the West". The working cowboy wore wide-brimmed and high-crowned hats. The hats were most likely adopted from civil war era slouch hats and may have been influenced by the Mexican Vaqueros before the invention of the modern design. John Batterson Stetson is credited for originating the modern day American Cowboy Hat.

The original "Boss of the Plains", manufactured by Stetson in 1865, was flat-brimmed, had a straight sided crown, with rounded corners. These light-weight, waterproof hats were natural in color, with four-inch crowns and brims. A plain hatband was fitted to adjust head size. The sweatband bore Stetson's name. While only making one style of hat, they came in different qualities ranging from one-grade material at five dollars apiece to pure beaver felt hats for thirty dollars each. J.B. Stetson was the first to market the "Boss of the Plains" to cowboys, and it has remained the universal image of the American West. The charisma of the West was carried back East when adventurers returned in the expensive "Boss of the plains" style hat. In the 19th century and first half of the 20th century, a hat was an indispensable item in every man's wardrobe. Stetson focused on expensive, high-quality hats that represented a real investment for the working cowboy and a statement of success for the city dweller.

The durability and water-resistance of the original Stetson obtained additional publicity in 1912, when the battleship USS Maine was raised from Havana harbor, where it had sunk in 1898. A Stetson hat was found in the wreck, which had been submerged in seawater for 14 years. The hat had been exposed to ooze, mud, and plant growth. However, the hat was cleaned off, and appeared to be undamaged.

Design

Modern cowboy hats are made of fur-based felt, straw or, less often, leather. They are sold with a tall, rounded crown and a wide flat brim. They have a simple sweat band on the inside to stabilize the fit of the head, and usually a small decorative hat band on the outside of the crown. Hats are customized by creasing the crown and rolling the brim. Hats are also sold pre-creased and pre-rolled. Often a more decorative hat band is added. In some places, "stampede strings" or "wind strings" are also attached. Hats can be manufactured in virtually any color, but are most often seen in shades of beige, brown and black. Beginning in the 1940s, pastel colors were introduced, seen often on hats worn by movie cowboys and rodeo riders. "Today's cowboy hat has remained basically unchanged in construction and design since the first one was created in 1865 by J.B. Stetson."

Modern designs

The modern cowboy hat has remained basically unchanged in construction and underlying design since the Stetson creation.
The cowboy hat quickly identified its wearer as someone associated with the West. "Within a decade the name 'John B. Stetson' became synonymous with the word 'hat' in every corner and culture west of the Mississippi River." The shape of the hat's crown and brim were often modified by the wearer for fashion and to protect against weather by being softened in hot steam, shaped, and allowed to dry and cool. Because of the ease of personalization, it was often possible to tell where a cowboy hat was from, right down to which ranch, simply by looking at the crease in the crown.

Later as the mystique of the Wild West was popularized by entertainers such as Buffalo Bill Cody and western movies starring actors such as Tom Mix, the Cowboy hat came to symbolize the American West. John Wayne christened them "the hat that won the West". The Boss of the Plains design influenced various wide-brimmed hats worn by farmers and ranchers all over the United States. Later designs were customized for law enforcement, military and motion pictures.

The first American law-enforcement agency to adopt Stetson's western hat as part of their uniform was the Texas Rangers. The Texas Legislature designated the cowboy hat as the official "State Hat of Texas" in 2015.

Variations

Ten-gallon hats
Some cowboy hats have been called "ten-gallon" hats. The term came into use about 1925. There are multiple theories for how the concept arose.

One theory is that the term "ten-gallon" is a corruption of the Spanish modifier , which loosely translates as "really handsome" or "so fine".  For example, "" translates as "such a fine hat".

Another theory is that the term "ten-gallon" is a corruption of the Spanish term , which means "galloon", a type of narrow braided trim around the crown, possibly a style adapted by Spanish cowboys.  When Texas cowboys misunderstood the word  for "gallon", the popular, though incorrect, legend may have been born. According to Reynolds and Rand, "The term ten-gallon did not originally refer to the holding capacity of the hat, but to the width of a Mexican sombrero hatband, and is more closely related to this unit of measurement by the Spanish than to the water-holding capacity of a Stetson."

Early print advertising by Stetson showed a cowboy giving his horse a drink of water from a hat.  The Stetson company notes that a "ten-gallon" hat holds only 3 quarts, not even one gallon (about 3 L instead of ).

Calgary White Hat
The Calgary White Hat is a white felt cowboy hat which is the symbol of both the Calgary Stampede annual rodeo and the city of Calgary. Created by Morris Shumiatcher, owner of Smithbilt Hat Company, it was worn for the first time at the 1946 Stampede. In the early 1950s, Mayor of Calgary Donald Hugh Mackay began presenting the white hat to visiting dignitaries, a tradition that the office of the mayor continues to this day. Thousands of tourists and groups also participate in "white hatting ceremonies" conducted by Tourism Calgary and by volunteer greeters at the Calgary International Airport. In 1983, the Calgary White Hat was incorporated into the design of the flag of Calgary.

See also

 Akubra
 Calgary White Hat
 Campaign hat
 Chupalla
 Cowboy boot
 Equestrian helmet
 Fedora
 Hardee hat
 John B. Stetson Company
 Resistol
 Slouch hat
 Sun hat
 Western wear

Footnotes

References
 Bender, Texan Bix (1994). Hats & the Cowboys Who Wear Them. 
 Blevins, Winfred ( 2001). Dictionary of the American West: over 5,000 terms and expressions from Aarigaa! to Zopilote.  
 Carlson, Laurie. (1998) Boss of the plains, the hat that won the West.  
 Christian, Mary Blount. (1992) Hats off to John Stetson  
 Foster-Harris, William (2007) The Look of the Old West: A Fully Illustrated Guide  
 Reynolds, William and Rich Rand (1995) The Cowboy Hat book. 
 Snyder, Jeffrey B. (1997) Stetson Hats and the John B. Stetson Company 1865–1970.

External links

1860s fashion
Cowboy culture
19th-century fashion
20th-century fashion
21st-century fashion
Hats
History of clothing (Western fashion)
History of fashion
Rider apparel
Western wear
Rodeo clothing
Hat